Werner Ferdinande (9 March 1927 – 8 November 2022), known as Will Ferdy,  was a Belgian singer. He was a figurehead within the gay community, because he was the first Flemish singer to come out. He received the Gay Krant award in 2006.
Earlier in his career, Ferdy was also active as a comedian. 

Ferdy suffered from Parkinson's disease. He died in Antwerp on 8 November 2022, at the age of 95.

References

External Links
 
 

1927 births
2022 deaths
Belgian male comedians
Belgian gay musicians
Dutch-language singers of Belgium
Belgian LGBT singers
People from Ghent
Gay singers
20th-century Belgian male singers
20th-century Belgian singers